Tekkali is a census town in Srikakulam district of the Indian state of Andhra Pradesh. It is the mandal headquarters of  Tekkali mandal and  Tekkali revenue division and is located at a distance of 51 KM from the district headquarters. The prominent actor Nandhamuri Taraka RamaRao represented this assembly constituency in AndhraPradesh General Legislative assembly Elections 1994.

Etymology 
The town derives its name from the eponymous medicinal tree. The Latin botanical name of Tekkali plant is Clerodendrum phlomides Linn. It belongs to the family Verbenacae. The Tekkali chettu (tree) is known by various alternate names too in various regions of Andhra Pradesh. For instance, it's also known by the name of Nelli (నెల్లి) from which Nellore City in Nellore district, and Nellimarla Town in Vizianagaram  district are said to derive their names.

Geography 
It has an average elevation of 27 meters (91 feet). It lies on the coast of Bay of Bengal with an area of 275 square miles.

Connectivity
The nearest airport is the Vishakhapatnam, which is at a distance of 150 km. National Highway 5 (Chennai - Kolkata) passes through the town. It is well connected with the nearest towns of Nandigam, Palasa, Meliaputti, Chapara, Sompeta, Mandasa, Kaviti, Itchapuram, Narasannapeta, Pathapatnam, Paralakhemundi and the district headquarter Srikakulam. Tekkali is 50 km away from Srikakulam headquarter.

There is a Railway station in Tekkali. Another nearby railway station is at Naupada called Naupada Junction(NWP). Naupada Junction is 4 km from Tekkali and is accessible by autorickshaws and private bus services.

Demography
According to The Imperial Gazetteer of India, Tekkali in 1901 was a Zamindari tahsil in Ganjam district of Madras province.

Education
The primary and secondary school education is enabled by government, government-aided and private schools, under the School Education Department of the state of Andhra Pradesh. The medium of instruction followed by different schools are English and Telugu.

References 

Cities and towns in Srikakulam district
Mandal headquarters in Srikakulam district